,  born Harumi Kitamura (Kitamura Harumi) in Kyoto,  is a Japanese enka singer. She made her debut in 1964. Her popularity has lasted: she makes frequent appearances in the annual television spectacular Kōhaku Uta Gassen and has acted in a number of films.

Filmography 
 Tora-san's Song of Love (Yoji Yamada, 1983): Harumi Kyo, a popular enka singer

Further reading 
  Miyako Harumi. Messēji / The Message. Tokyo: Juritsusha, 2006.  About half this book consists of quotations from interviews with Miyako, and the other half of color photographs by Hiroh Kikai. Despite the English alternative title, the text is all in Japanese.

1948 births
Japanese film actresses
Japanese women singers
Japanese actresses of Korean descent
Living people
Nippon Columbia artists
People from Kyoto
Musicians from Kyoto Prefecture
Recipients of the Medal with Purple Ribbon